Merton Sandler (28 March 1926 – 24 August 2014) was a British professor of chemical pathology and a pioneer in biological psychiatry.

Education and career
Sandler studied at the Manchester Grammar School and the University of Manchester. In 1959, he suggested a link between depression and monoamine deficiency in the brain, which led to the development of antidepressants. Sandler was Professor of Chemical Pathology at the University of London from 1973 to 1991.

Private life
Sandler married Lorna Grenby in 1961 and they had four children. He was an active Freemason initiated in 1954 in the In Arduis Fidelis Lodge (London), and two years later in the Holy Royal Arch. He belonged to several lodges and chapters, and held office in the United Grand Lodge of England.

References

External links 

 

1926 births
2014 deaths
People educated at Manchester Grammar School
Alumni of the University of Manchester
Chemical pathologists
Academics of the University of London